Naby Laye "Papa" Camara (1952 – 4 January 2018) was a Guinean footballer of the 1970s and 1980s and football manager.

He was regarded as one of Guinea's all-time great players, a stalwart of the highly successful Hafia FC side of the 1970s and early 1980s and a Guinean national team which was among Africa's strongest during this period.

He played in five African Club Champions Cup finals - the former African Champions League competition - winning three continental titles with the Conakry-based club, Hafia FC.

Known for his dribbling skills, Camara partnered well with the 1972 African Player of the year Cherif Souleymane and played alongside the likes of Petit Sory, Maxine Camara, Cham Ousmane Tolo, Bangaly Sylla and Aliou Njolea to make Hafia FC the most successful club in Africa in the 70's

He also helped Syli Nationale finish as runners-up to Morocco at the 1976 Africa Cup of Nations, the furthest Guinea have ever reached at a Nations Cup.

In recent years, he served as an assistant coach for the national side. He managed the Guinea national football team at the 1994 African Cup of Nations.

References

External links

1952 births
2018 deaths
Guinean footballers
Guinea international footballers
1976 African Cup of Nations players
1980 African Cup of Nations players
Association football goalkeepers
Hafia FC players
Guinean football managers
Guinea national football team managers
1994 African Cup of Nations managers
Footballers from Dakar